The 2001–02 NBA season was the 13th season for the Orlando Magic in the National Basketball Association. During the off-season, the Magic signed free agent All-Star center Patrick Ewing to their roster, and re-signed former Magic forward Horace Grant to further strengthen the team's depth. Early into the season, the team traded Bo Outlaw to the Phoenix Suns in exchange for Jud Buechler. The Magic played around .500 with a 25–24 record at the All-Star break. However, Grant Hill's comeback was ended after only just 14 games, averaging 16.8 points, 8.9 rebounds and 4.6 assists per game, as he had to get more surgery on his bad ankle. Despite Hill's injury, the Magic posted a six-game winning streak in March, and made it to the playoffs with a record of 44–38, third in the Atlantic Division.

Tracy McGrady continued to emerge as a superstar as he finished fourth in the NBA in scoring with 25.6 points per game, along with 7.9 rebounds, 5.3 assists and 1.6 steals per game, and was named to the All-NBA First Team, and was selected for the 2002 NBA All-Star Game. McGrady finished in fourth place in Most Valuable Player voting with 7 first-place votes. In addition, second-year star Mike Miller continued to improve averaging 15.2 points per game, while Darrell Armstrong contributed 12.4 points, 5.5 assists and 1.9 steals per game, and Troy Hudson and Pat Garrity both provided scoring off the bench, averaging 11.7 and 11.1 points per game respectively.

However, in the Eastern Conference First Round of the playoffs, the Magic lost in four games to the Charlotte Hornets. Following the season, Ewing retired after seventeen seasons in the NBA, and would take a job as the assistant coach for the Washington Wizards, while Hudson signed as a free agent with the Minnesota Timberwolves, Monty Williams signed with the Philadelphia 76ers, and Buechler and Dee Brown both retired.

Draft picks

Roster

Roster Notes
 Small forward Grant Hill played 14 games (his last game being on November 26, 2001), but missed the rest of the season and the playoffs after undergoing season-ending surgery on December 19, 2001 to remove bone spurs from his left ankle, and it was the second surgery he had in a year and the third operation on his left ankle.

Regular season

Season standings

z – clinched division title
y – clinched division title
x – clinched playoff spot

Record vs. opponents

Game log

Playoffs

|- align="center" bgcolor="#ffcccc"
| 1
| April 20
| @ Charlotte
| L 79–80
| Tracy McGrady (20)
| Horace Grant (10)
| Tracy McGrady (6)
| Charlotte Coliseum9,505
| 0–1
|- align="center" bgcolor="#ccffcc"
| 2
| April 23
| @ Charlotte
| W 111–103 (OT)
| Tracy McGrady (31)
| Tracy McGrady (11)
| Tracy McGrady (7)
| Charlotte Coliseum10,323
| 1–1
|- align="center" bgcolor="#ffcccc"
| 3
| April 27
| Charlotte
| L 100–110 (OT)
| Tracy McGrady (37)
| Garrity, Grant (10)
| Darrell Armstrong (8)
| TD Waterhouse Centre16,754
| 1–2
|- align="center" bgcolor="#ffcccc"
| 4
| April 30
| Charlotte
| L 85–102
| Tracy McGrady (35)
| Patrick Ewing (10)
| Tracy McGrady (6)
| TD Waterhouse Centre16,254
| 1–3
|-

Player statistics

Season

Playoffs

Awards and honors
 Tracy McGrady – All-NBA 1st Team, All-Star

Transactions

Trades

Free agents

Player Transactions Citation:

References

Orlando Magic seasons
2001 in sports in Florida
2002 in sports in Florida